A "Doom painting" or "Doom" is a traditional English term for a wall-painting of the Last Judgment in a medieval church. This is the moment in Christian eschatology when Christ judges souls to send them to either Heaven or Hell. 

The subject was very commonly painted on a large scale on the western wall of churches, so it was viewed as people left the church, and the term is typically used of these, rather than depictions of the Last Judgement in other locations or media. Many examples survive as wall-paintings in medieval churches, most dating from around the 12th to 13th centuries, although the subject was common from the 1st millennium until (in countries remaining Catholic) the Counter-Reformation. Most dooms in English churches were destroyed by government authority during the English Reformation.

The most famous of all Doom paintings, The Last Judgment by Michelangelo in the Sistine Chapel, painted in 1537 to 1541, comes at the end of the tradition, and is unusually sited on the east wall behind the altar.

The term "Doom"
Doom or "the Doom" was a specific term for the Last Judgement and first cited to c. 1200 by the OED ("doom", 6), a sense surviving in this artistic meaning and in phrases such as the "crack of doom" and the word "doomsday", the latter going back to Old English. The original OED in the late 19th century already described this sense of "doom" as "archaic", but it remains in use in descriptions of (mostly) British medieval churches.

Purpose and iconography
Dooms were encouraged by the early medieval Church as an instrument to highlight the contrasts between the reward of Heaven and the agony of Hell so as to guide Christians away from misbehaviour and sin. A Doom was usually positioned either on the rear (liturgical Western) wall, if that space was available, or at the front (chancel end) of a church, often on the chancel arch itself so that it would be constantly visible to worshippers as they faced the altar during services.

Although there are many different versions, the composition stays broadly the same. On the left side of a Doom painting (that is, on Christ's right hand) is Heaven, whilst on the right (Christ's left) is Hell. At the top of the image Jesus Christ sits in glory with his right hand encouraging the saved upward, and his left hand pointing down to Hell for the damned. Typically flanking him is the Virgin Mary on his right and John the Apostle on his left, sometimes with the twenty-four elders mentioned in the Book of Revelation encircling the three of them. The angels blow trumpets to raise the dead for judgment. Commonly the Archangel Michael is in the centre, with the scales he will use to weigh the souls of humanity to see if individually they are fit for Heaven: one person is on one side of the scale while demonic creatures that represent the sins committed by the person are on the other side of the scale. The creatures try to tip the scales in their favour while, in some versions of the painting, the Virgin Mary places a rosary next to the person she wishes to protect, or puts her hand on the scale to counterbalance the demons. In some other versions, while one of the saved enters Heaven, a demon tries to pull them in with the damned, while an angel fights the demon for the soul.

Those who are worthy are brought to the gates of Heaven, frequently represented by a castle with large walls built to keep out sinful impurities. This is most commonly depicted on the left hand side of Doom paintings. Groups of angels adorn the walls of Heaven celebrating the saved as they approach Heaven's gates, where Saint Peter waits with his keys.

Those on the other side are deemed unworthy of Heaven, usually seized by demons and brought into the Hellmouth, beyond which, mostly out of sight, lie the bowels of hell.

A decisive factor in the Doom or Last Judgement will be the question, if the corporal works of mercy were practiced or not during lifetime. They rate as important acts of charity. Therefore, and according to the biblical sources (Mt 5:31-46), the conjunction of the Last Judgement and the works of mercy is very frequent in the pictorial tradition of Christian art.

At Chaldon in Surrey the west wall of the church has a painting of the Ladder of Salvation (a subject common in the Eastern Church but this is the only example in England). This painting dates from about 1200 and is 17.5 ft long and 11.21 ft high. It is in the church of Saints Peter and Paul, Chaldon (built before 1086 AD), and depicts images of the ways of salvation and damnation and their result.

Examples in English churches

There are examples of doom and related paintings in the churches of following English towns and villages:

Ashampstead, Berkshire
Attleborough, Norfolk (Christ in Majesty)
Bacton, Suffolk
Bartlow, Cambridgeshire (Weighing of Souls)
Beckley, Oxfordshire
Bishopsbourne, Kent (Weighing of Souls)
Blyth, Nottinghamshire
Bradfield, Norfolk
Broughton, Buckinghamshire
Broughton, Cambridgeshire
Catherington, Hampshire (Weighing of Souls)
Chelsworth, Suffolk
Chesterton, Cambridgeshire
Coventry (Holy Trinity Church), Warwickshire
Croughton, Northamptonshire (Weighing of Souls)
Dauntsey, Wiltshire
Great Harrowden, Bedfordshire
Great Shelford, Cambridgeshire
Houghton Conquest, Bedfordshire (Christ in Majesty)
Ickleton, Cambridgeshire
Lenham, Kent (Weighing of Souls)
Marston Moreteyne, Bedfordshire
Marton, Cheshire
Mears Ashby, Northamptonshire
Newington-next-Sittingbourne, Kent
North Cove, Suffolk
Oddington, Gloucestershire
Pickworth, Lincolnshire
Rotherfield, East Sussex (Doom)
Rotherfield, E Sussex (Weighing of Souls)
Salisbury, Wiltshire (At St Thomas's Church; Largest and best preserved in UK) 
Slapton, Northamptonshire (Weighing of Souls)
South Leigh, Oxfordshire (Doom)
South Leigh, Oxfordshire (St Michael Weighing Souls)
Stanningfield, Suffolk
Stoke-by-Clare, Suffolk
Stratford-upon-Avon, the Guild chapel, Warwickshire
Swanbourne, Buckinghamshire (Allegory of the Penitent and Impenitent Soul)
Wenhaston, Suffolk
West Somerton, Norfolk
Widford, Hertfordshire (Christ in Judgement)
Wissington, Suffolk (Weighing of Souls)
Yaxley, Suffolk

Notes

Further reading
Tristram, E. W. English Medieval Wall Painting; 12th-14th cent.. 3 vols. 1944-55

External links
 "The Doom, or Last Judgement and the Weighing of Souls" at Medieval Wall Painting in the English Parish Church
 Doom Paintings and their Significance, at Allan Barton- Art Historian, Youtube Channel

Medieval art
Christian iconography
Judgment in Christianity
Christian art